The 2015 Pinstripe Bowl was a post-season American college football bowl game played on December 26, 2015 at Yankee Stadium in the New York City borough of the Bronx. The sixth edition of the Pinstripe Bowl featured the Indiana Hoosiers of the Big Ten Conference against the Duke Blue Devils of the Atlantic Coast Conference. It began at 3:30 p.m. EST and aired on ABC.  It was one of the 2015–16 bowl games that concluded the 2015 FBS football season.  Sponsored by the New Era Cap Company, the game was officially known as the New Era Pinstripe Bowl. This bowl marked Duke's first bowl victory in 54 years. Although Duke had reached 4 consecutive bowl games, they had lost the previous three.

Teams
The game featured the Indiana Hoosiers against the Duke Blue Devils.

Indiana Hoosiers

After finishing their season 6–6, Holtzman extended an invitation for the Hoosiers to play in the game, which they accepted as well.

This was the Hoosiers' tenth bowl game (they were 3–6 in bowl games previously) and their first since the 2007 Insight Bowl, where they lost to Oklahoma State by a score of 49–33.  The Hoosiers sought their first bowl victory since the 1991 Copper Bowl (where they shut out Baylor 24–0).

Duke Blue Devils

After finishing their regular season 7–5, bowl director Mark Holtzman extended an invitation for the Blue Devils to play in the game, which they accepted.

This was the Blue Devils' twelfth bowl game (they were previously 3–8 in bowl games) and their fourth consecutive bowl game (their longest-and only-bowl streak in school history), where they sought their first bowl victory in 54 years (their last bowl win was when they beat Arkansas in the 1961 Cotton Bowl Classic by a score of 7–6).  It was also the Blue Devils' second bowl game against an opponent from the Big Ten; their first was the 1995 Hall of Fame Bowl, where they lost to Wisconsin by a score of 34–20.

Game summary

Scoring summary

Statistics

References

External links
 Box score at ESPN

Pinstripe Bowl
Pinstripe Bowl
Duke Blue Devils football bowl games
Indiana Hoosiers football bowl games
Pinstripe Bowl
Pinstripe Bowl
2010s in the Bronx